Cunningham's spiny-tailed skink (Egernia cunninghami), also known commonly as Cunningham's skink, is a species of large skink, a lizard in the family Scincidae. The species is native to southeastern Australia.

Etymology
Both the specific name, cunninghami, and the common names are in honour of English botanist and explorer Allan Cunningham.

Description
E. cunninghami can reach up to 40 cm (16 inches) in total length (including tail), and may be confused with the blue-tongued lizards (genus Tiliqua).

Cunningham's spiny-tailed skink has a distinctive keel on each scale, which gives it a slightly spiny appearance. It is extremely variable in colour, ranging from dark brown to black, with or without blotchy patches, speckles, or narrow bands.

Habitat
E. cunninghami prefers to live communally in the crevices of rocky outcrops or hollow logs.

Diet
Cunningham's spiny-tailed skink is a diurnal omnivore, with its diet including insects, flowers, berries, fungi, leaves and young shoots.

Conservation status
There is currently research being done on the isolated population of Cunningham's skink that inhabits the southern Mount Lofty Ranges in South Australia. This population is considered vulnerable due to the fragmented (disjunct) distribution of the "colonies". There is evidence that at least one of these colonies has totally disappeared. It is more common within suitable habitat along the southeastern coast and ranges of Australia.

Reproduction
Like some other reptiles, E. cunninghami is viviparous, giving birth to six or more live young in a litter.

Inbreeding avoidance
Habitat fragmentation can affect a species population by disrupting core processes.  One such process is inbreeding avoidance (avoiding inbreeding depression).  The impact of habitat alteration (deforestation) on inbreeding was studied in the rock-dwelling Australian lizard Egernia cunninghami.  Such populations in deforested areas experience potentially inbreeding-enhancing factors such as reduced dispersal and increased relatedness.  However, active avoidance of close kin as mates was observed, as indicated by the substantially lower relatedness in actual breeding pairs compared to potential ones expected if there were random mating.  This finding, as well as heterozygous excesses in immature lizards from disturbed (as well as undisturbed) habitats indicated that it maintains outbreeding in the face of increased accumulation of relatives.

Gallery

References

External links
Egernia cunninghami, Australian Faunal Directory.

Further reading
Boulenger GA (1887). Catalogue of the Lizards in the British Museum (Natural History). Second Edition. Volume III. ... Scincidæ ... London: Trustees of the British Museum (Natural History). (Taylor and Francis, printers). xii + 575 pp. + Plates I-XL. (Egernia cunninghami, pp. 139–140).
Cogger HG (2014). Reptiles and Amphibians of Australia, Seventh Edition. Clayton, Victoria, Australia: CSIRO Publishing. xxx + 1,033 pp. .
Gray [JE] (1832). "Three new animals, brought from New Holland by Mr. Cunningham". Proceedings of the Zoological Society of London 1832: 39-40. (Tiliqua cunninghami, new species, p. 40). (in English and Latin).
Gray JE (1845). Catalogue of the Specimens of Lizards in the Collection of the British Museum. London: Trustees of the British Museum. (Edward Newman, printer). xxviii + 289 pp. (Egernia cunninghami, p. 105).
Wilson S, Swan G (2013). A Complete Guide to Reptiles of Australia, Fourth Edition. Sydney: New Holland Publishers. 522 pp. .

Egernia
Skinks of Australia
Endemic fauna of Australia
Reptiles described in 1832
Taxa named by John Edward Gray